Old Eyes is an album by multi-instrumentalist and composer Joe McPhee, recorded in 1979 and first released on the Swiss HatHut label in 1980. It was rereleased on CD in 1992 as Old Eyes & Mysteries with  bonus tracks recorded in 1990.

Reception

Allmusic awarded the album 4 stars.

Track listing 
All compositions by Joe McPhee
 "Eroc Tinu" - 4:00
 "Land Dance" - 12:45
 "P / G / G" 	
 "BCL / Cello""  	
 "B / DM" 	
 "TS / TS" 	
 "Old Eyes" - 8:50
 "Django" (John Lewis) - 14:25
 "No Line" - 3:05
 "Strings" - 7:10
 "Women's Mysteries: Woman of Darkness" - 8:56  Bonus track on CD reissue 		
 "Women's Mysteries: Woman of Passion" - 4:41  Bonus track on CD reissue
 "Women's Mysteries: Woman of Lotus" - 5:02  Bonus track on CD reissue
 "Women's Mysteries: Woman of Skies" - 5:28  Bonus track on CD reissue

Personnel 
Joe McPhee - tenor saxophone, alto saxophone, flugelhorn, trumpet
Urs Leimgruber  - tenor saxophone, soprano saxophone (tracks 7-10)
André Jaume - tenor saxophone, bass clarinet (tracks 1-6)
Raymond Boni, Steve Gnitka - guitar (tracks 1-6)
Jean-Charles Capon - cello (tracks 1-6)
Pierre-Yves Sorin - bass (tracks 1-6)
Milo Fine - piano, drums (tracks 1-6)

References 

Joe McPhee albums
1980 albums
Hathut Records albums